Muratlar may refer to:

 Muratlar, Bayramiç
 Muratlar, Bolu
 Muratlar, İhsaniye